Shadowrun Duels is a collectible miniatures game published by WizKids in 2003 that was based on the Shadowrun role-playing game originally produced by FASA Corporation.

Description
In 2002, WizKids won three awards at the Origins Awards for their HeroClix system, a series of 28 mm miniatures mounted on a rotating dial that could track the changing statistics of the figure. They proved popular, and the following year, WizKids released Shadowrun Duels, a collectible miniatures game using a similar rotating dial system, but with much larger 6" (1:12 scale) figurines that were molded by Plan B Toys. The base has three Clix dials that track damage to the head, weapon, or body.

Duels between miniatures take place on a flat surface that is at least 5 ft x 5 ft (1.5 m x 1.5m), and the figurines must start at least 4 ft (1.2 m) apart. When damage is done to a figurine, the owning player marks the damage on any one of the three dials. When all three totals reach zero, the miniature is eliminated from the duel. 

WizKids originally announced that there would be three releases of six figurines each, but the third series was never produced due to the low sales of the first two series.  However, a series of cards that can give figures a bonus was given out as convention and tournament bonuses.

As of 2010, the rights to the game are in the hands of Topps, which bought WizKids in 2003, and then sold WizKids — but not the Shadowrun property — in 2009.

Figures

Release 3 would have included:
 Cyberzombie (male)
 Decker (female)
 Saeder-Krupp Security Guard
 Scottish Elf (male)
 Street Ganger (male)
 Vampire (female)

Reception
The website OAFE reviewed two of the figurines. The first,  "Kellan Colt", was a special publicity release between the first two Series, and received the comment that "The figure doesn't really bear much of a resemblance to the box art, though she is sculpted well." The reviewer also noted that as a money-saving device, the body used the same mold as "Kyushi" from Series 1, and several weapons were "borrowed" from Series 2 figurines. The Second Series figurine  "Karkhov" was judged to have excellent sculpting "from the texture of his clothes to the detailing on his weapons." The ball-jointed articulation in the shoulders, pin-jointed elbows, knees, wrists, and peg jointed neck, waist and hips was noted with the comment, "This isn't bad, but more leg articulation - particularly balljointed hips and ankle joints - would have greatly improved this figure."

Awards
Shadowrun Duels won the 2003 Origins Awards for Best Science Fiction Miniatures Rules.

References

External links
 
 
 
 
 Shadowrun Duels at Board Game Geek (Image gallery includes Release 3 prototypes)

Games and sports introduced in 2003
Clix (miniatures) games
Collectible action figure games
Collectible miniatures games
Cyberpunk games
Origins Award winners
Shadowrun
WizKids games